Events in the year 1993 in Burkina Faso.

Incumbents 

 President: Blaise Compaoré
 Prime Minister: Youssouf Ouédraogo

Events 

 27 August – The Party for Democracy and Rally was founded by Daouda Bayili of the African Independence Party.

Deaths

References 

 
1990s in Burkina Faso
Years of the 20th century in Burkina Faso
Burkina Faso
Burkina Faso